Tommy Söderström (born July 17, 1969) is a Swedish former professional ice hockey goaltender.

Career 
He played in 156 National Hockey League (NHL) games with the Philadelphia Flyers and New York Islanders over parts of five seasons. He also played for Djurgårdens IF, with which he won three Swedish Championships.

Honours

Club 
Djurgården

 Swedish Champion: 1988–89, 1989–90, 1999–2000

International 
Sweden

 Ice Hockey World Championships: 1991, 1992

Personal life 
He participated in Mästarnas mästare in 2014.

References

External links
 

1969 births
Djurgårdens IF Hockey players
Hershey Bears players
Ice hockey players at the 1992 Winter Olympics
Ice hockey players at the 1998 Winter Olympics
Living people
New York Islanders players
Olympic ice hockey players of Sweden
Philadelphia Flyers draft picks
Philadelphia Flyers players
Rochester Americans players
Ice hockey people from Stockholm
Swedish expatriate ice hockey players in the United States
Swedish ice hockey goaltenders
Utah Grizzlies (IHL) players